Prince Ding of the First Rank, or simply Prince Ding, was the title of a princely peerage used in China during the Manchu-led Qing dynasty (1636–1912). As the Prince Ding peerage was not awarded "iron-cap" status, this meant that each successive bearer of the title would normally start off with a title downgraded by one rank vis-à-vis that held by his predecessor. However, the title would generally not be downgraded to any lower than a feng'en fuguo gong except under special circumstances.

The first bearer of the title was Yonghuang (1728–1750), the Qianlong Emperor's eldest son, who received the title posthumously in 1750. The title was passed down over seven generations and held by eight persons.

Members of the Prince Ding peerage

 Yonghuang (1728–1750), the Qianlong Emperor's eldest son, posthumously honoured as Prince Ding'an of the First Rank (定安親王) in 1750
 Miande (綿德; 1747–1786), Yonghuang's eldest son, initially a qinwang, demoted to junwang in 1752, stripped of his title in 1776, restored as a feng'en zhenguo gong in 1777, promoted to beizi in 1784
 Yichun (奕純; 1767–1816), Miande's eldest son, initially a third class fuguo jiangjun, promoted to feng'en zhenguo gong and then to beizi from 1786 to 1816
 Zaixi (載錫), Yichun's eldest son, initially a third class fuguo jiangjun from 1799 to 1809, promoted to feng'en zhenguo gong in 1809, promoted to beizi in 1816
 Puxi (溥喜), Zaixi's second son, initially a feng'en zhenguo gong, demoted to buru bafen fuguo gong in 1832, stripped of his title in 1838
 Puji (溥吉), Zaixi's third son, held the title of a third class zhenguo jiangjun from 1825 to 1838, promoted to feng'en fuguo gong in 1838, had no male heir
 Zaiming (載銘; 1795–1840), Yichun's third son, held the title of a third class fuguo jiangjun from 1816 to 1840
 Puxian (溥咸), Zaiming's second son, held the title of a third class fengguo jiangjun from 1843 to 1866, promoted to buru bafen fuguo gong in 1866
 Yuhou (毓厚), Puxian's eldest son, held the title of a buru bafen fuguo gong from 1868 to 1890, had no male heir
 Yuxiang (毓祥), Puhe's third son, held the title of a buru bafen fuguo gong from 1891 to 1926
 Mian'en (綿恩; 1747–1822), Yonghuang's second son, initially a junwang, promoted to qinwang in 1793, posthumously honoured as Prince Dinggong of the First Rank (定恭親王)
 Yishao (奕紹; 1776–1836), Mian'en's second son, held the title of a buru bafen fuguo gong from 1799 to 1803, promoted to feng'en fuguo gong in 1803, promoted to beizi in 1804, promoted to beile in 1819, succeeded his father as Prince Ding of the First Rank in 1822, posthumously honoured as Prince Dingduan of the First Rank (定端親王)
 Zaiquan (載銓; 1794–1854), Yishao's eldest son, initially a second class fuguo jiangjun, promoted to second class zhenguo jiangjun in 1823, promoted to buru bafen zhenguo gong in 1831, promoted to feng'en fuguo gong in 1835, held the title of a junwang from 1836 to 1854, posthumously promoted to qinwang and honoured as Prince Dingmin of the First Rank (定敏親王)
 Puxu (溥煦; 1831–1907), Zaiming's fifth son and Zaiquan's successor, held the title of a junwang from 1854 to 1907, posthumously honoured as Prince Dingshen of the Second Rank (定慎郡王)
 Yuchang (毓長; 1851–1903), Puxu's eldest son, held the title of a zhenguo jiangjun from 1872 to 1903
 Hengqi (恆圻; 1887–1956), Yuchang's fifth son, held the title of a fuguo jiangjun from 1903 to 1945
 Qizu (啟族; 1915–2002), Hengqi's son, adopted the name "Jin Yi'an", calligrapher and poet
 Qikai (啟凱; 1925–?), Hengqi's son
 Yulang (毓朗; 1864–1922), Puxu's second son, initially a third class zhenguo jiangjun, held the title of a beile from 1907 to 1922, posthumously honoured as Minda Beile (敏達貝勒)
 Hengbo (恆馞; 1907–1956), Yulang's second son, held the title of a beizi from 1922 to 1945
 Qixing (啟星; 1927–1971), Hengbo's son
 Yuying (毓盈; 1881–1922), Puxu's fourth son, held the title of a third class zhenguo jiangjun from 1903
 Henglan (恆蘭), Yuying's eldest son, held the title of a fuguo jiangjun

Family tree

See also
 Royal and noble ranks of the Qing dynasty

References
 

Qing dynasty princely peerages